Jordan Hill is a census-designated place (CDP) in Winn Parish, Louisiana, United States.

Demographics

Notes

Census-designated places in Winn Parish, Louisiana
Census-designated places in Louisiana
Populated places in Ark-La-Tex